The Roccia Nera (Italian for Black Rock) is a peak of the Breithorn range in the Pennine Alps, on the boundary between the Aosta Valley (northern Italy) and canton of Valais (southern Switzerland). It is the easternmost summit of the Breithorn massif, located east of the Gendarm (or eastern Breithorn Twin). It overlooks the Schwarztor pass on its east side.

References

External links

 Roccia Nera on Summitpost

Alpine four-thousanders
Mountains of the Alps
Mountains of Switzerland
Pennine Alps
Mountains of Aosta Valley
Italy–Switzerland border
International mountains of Europe
Mountains of Valais